Henrik Gottlieb is a Danish linguist and translation scholar, who is most known for his work in audiovisual translation.  He is an associate professor emeritus at the University of Copenhagen.

Education and career 
Gottlieb was born in Copenhagen, Denmark, in 1953. After finishing school in 1971, he worked as a subtitler for Danish public service broadcaster Danmarks Radio and TV 2 (Denmark) in the 1980s and 1990s. He later enlisted at  University of Copenhagen from where he got his MA in 1991, with a thesis titled Tekstning - Synkron billedmedie­oversættelse (Subtitling - Synchronous Screen Translation). He went on to work as a research assistant and research fellow at the same university, and received his PhD in 1998 with a dissertation titled Subtitles, Translation & Idioms. Gottlieb continued working at the University of Copenhagen after completing the PhD.  He was promoted to associate professor in 2000, and retired in 2022.  Even though he pursued an academic career, he still kept in contact with the world of broadcasting, working as a research consultant at the TV International subtitling department of Danmarks Radio in Copenhagen.

Work 
Gottlieb was editor in chief of Perspectives: Studies in Translation Theory and Practice from 2006 until 2011, and is still on the editorial board of that journal. He is a founding member of ESIST, the European Association for Studies in Screen Translation along with Jan Ivarsson and others. Among his more influential works in audiovisual translation is the aforementioned Subtitles, Translation & Idioms  and also Screen Translation: Eight Studies in Subtitling, Dubbing and Voice-Over.

Selected works 
 Gottlieb, Henrik. 1991. Tekstning - Synkron billedmedie­oversættelse. University of Copenhagen: Centre for Translation Studies 
 Gottlieb, Henrik. 1997. Subtitles, Translation & Idioms. University of Copenhagen: Centre for Translation Studies 
 Gottlieb, Henrik. 2003. Screen Translation: Eight Studies in Subtitling, Dubbing and Voice-Over. University of Copenhagen: Centre for Translation Studies

References 

Living people
1953 births
People from Copenhagen
Translation scholars
Danish scholars